The Portrait of Kristóf Hegedűs is an 1844 painting by Hungarian painter József Borsos. It was one of his earliest works.

The oil on canvas measures 126.5 x 82 cm and is currently on display at the Historical Picture Gallery section of the Hungarian National Museum, Budapest

Sources
Works by Jozef Borsos

1844 paintings
Hungarian paintings
Hungarian National Museum